Alford Windmill is a five-sailed windmill in Alford, Lincolnshire and the only surviving windmill out of four. Though the windmill has been restored to working order, it no longer   supplies flour for sale.

Construction

Alford Windmill is a seven-storeyed Lincolnshire type tower windmill with a stage – featuring a slender, tapering brick tower, tarred to keep the moisture out, covered with a white onion-shaped (ogee) cap with fan-stage, huge fantail, and white sails. She has five patent-shutter sails and originally three, later on four, pairs of stones (two pairs of grey or peak stones (cut from rock found in the Peak District) and two French "quartzite" stones).

The Seven Storeys

ground floor (contains a hurst frame with the engine-driven (from the outside) fourth pair of (grey) stones)
storage floor
spout (stage) floor (also called meal floor)
stones floor (with the original three pairs of stones (one grey pair, two French pairs)
lower bin floor
upper bin floor (with the sack hoist)
dust or cap floor (providing access to the inside of the cap)

The mill provides a flywheel at the mill's base connected by pulley to a town gas driven engine in the adjacent shed. This engine makes the mill independent of wind if it is insufficient to drive the sailcross. In its heyday Alford Mill was capable of grinding 4 to 5 tonnes of corn a day.

History

Built as a seven-storeyed windmill in 1837 by the well-known local millwright John Oxley the mill belonged to a group of four windmills and is the sole survivor today. At the end of the 19th to the beginning of the 20th century Alford featured a four-sailed mill, Wallace's or Station Mill, now a stump; a five-sailed windmill, Hoyles's Windmill, today's Alford Mill; and a six-sailer, the six-storeyed Myers's Windmill, built in 1827 with six left-handed sails, and also called the Alford Mill dismantled in 1973.

The last commercial operators of the windmill were the Hoyles family. Purchased by Harry Hoyles, a local farmer and land owner, in the early 20th century, the business of milling and baking continued until 1955, run by his sons Walter, Arthur and Winston (The Miller). In those times the mill was known as the Hoyles's Mill. The business closed due to advancements in technology in 1955 and the mill was initially sold to Fred Banks of Kirton in Lindsey in 1957, a private buyer and owner of Mount Pleasant Mill, who subsequently restored the windmill to working order. The last surviving windmill became then known as the Alford Windmill.

In 1978, miller Fred Banks had to replace the mill's cap and all five sails. The same year the mill changed hands to the Lincolnshire County Council which took care for the mill's restoration over many years. The mill remained leased to Mr Banks, the former owner, until 1986 when he gave up his milling business, his place being taken by James Waterfield of Boston in the following year, owner of the famous Maud Foster Windmill. The mill was then leased to Geoff Dees for some years, until the lease was sold in January 2010 to the current lease holder, Ian Shepherd.

References

External links
 Five Sailed Windmill, Alford - Official Website

Windmills in Lincolnshire
Tower mills in the United Kingdom
Grinding mills in the United Kingdom
Windmills completed in 1837
Towers completed in 1837
Windmills
Grade I listed buildings in Lincolnshire
Grade I listed windmills
Alford, Lincolnshire